The terrestrial brownbul (Phyllastrephus terrestris) is a species of songbird in the bulbul family, Pycnonotidae.
It is found in eastern and south-eastern Africa. Its natural habitats are subtropical or tropical dry forest, subtropical or tropical moist lowland forest, and subtropical or tropical moist shrubland.

Taxonomy and systematics
Alternate names for the terrestrial brownbul include the bristle-necked brownbul, brownbul, scrub bulbul and terrestrial bulbul.

Subspecies
Four subspecies are recognized:
 Nyasa terrestrial brownbul (P. t. suahelicus) - Reichenow, 1904: Found from southern Somalia to northern Mozambique
 P. t. intermedius - Gunning & Roberts, 1911: Found in southern Zimbabwe, southern Mozambique & adjacent eastern South Africa
 P. t. rhodesiae - Roberts, 1917: Found from south-western Angola, Zambia, south-eastern Democratic Republic of the Congo, and south-western Tanzania to northern Botswana, northern Zimbabwe and north-eastern Mozambique
 P. t. terrestris - Swainson, 1837: Found in eastern and southern South Africa

References

External links
 (Terrestrial brownbul =) Terrestrial bulbul - Species text in The Atlas of Southern African Birds.

Pycnonotidae
Phyllastrephus
Birds of East Africa
Birds described in 1837
Taxonomy articles created by Polbot